Milk and Honey ( Khalav U'Dvash) was an Israeli vocal group. The original line-up consisted of Shmulik Bilu, Reuven Gvirtz, Yehuda Tamir and Gali Atari.

History
The group was assembled in 1978 by producer Shlomo Zach and composer Kobi Oshrat, after both Hakol Over Habibi and Yardena Arazi turned down the opportunity to perform Oshrat's song "Hallelujah" in the Israeli national selection for the Eurovision Song Contest 1979. Milk and Honey eventually won the national selection, and went on to also win the Eurovision Song Contest 1979. "Hallelujah" peaked in the UK Singles Chart at #5 in April 1979. The group had one other international hit, "Goodbye New York".

Less than a year after the song contest, Atari retired from Milk and Honey and was replaced by Leah Lupatin in 1981. The same year, Atari sued Zach for unpaid royalties; in 1994, an Israeli court ruled in Atari's favour, ordering Zach to pay the royalties. Subsequently, in 2003, Zach and his partners sued Oshrat, alleging that Oshrat should have also contributed to the payments made to Atari, as he was a partner in the group. That lawsuit was settled in 2009 through mediation.

Milk and Honey competed in the national final on two further occasions; they performed the song "Serenada" in 1981, coming fourth, and "Ani Ma'amin" in 1989, where they came eighth. Gvirtz and Tamir accompanied the Israeli song contest act in 1988.

See also
Music of Israel

References

Eurovision Song Contest winners
Eurovision Song Contest entrants of 1979
Eurovision Song Contest entrants for Israel
Israeli pop music groups
Musical groups established in 1979